Ella Bay is a national park beside Ella Bay and spans the localities of Wanjuru in the Cassowary Coast Region and Eubenangee in the Cairns Region, Queensland, Australia.

Geography 
The park is 1329 km northwest of Brisbane.  It is part of the Coastal Wet Tropics Important Bird Area, identified as such by BirdLife International because of its importance for the conservation of lowland tropical rainforest birds.  It can be reached via Flying Fish Point on Ella Bay Road. The largest and most prominent mountain in the park is Mount Arthur, which rises to 478 meters above sea level.

Wildlife 
394 species of animals and 462 species of plants have been recorded in Ella Bay National Park. Of these, 12 species of animals and 13 species of plants are rare or endangered.

Amenities 
Adjacent to the park are camping facilities which are closed .

See also

 Protected areas of Queensland

References

National parks of Far North Queensland
Protected areas established in 1952
1952 establishments in Australia
Important Bird Areas of Queensland